Dezső Zádor (Hung. Zádor Dezső; 20 November 1912, Uzhhorod – 16 September 1985, Lviv) was a Ukrainian pianist, organist, conductor, and composer. He taught in Hungary, Czechoslovakia and Ukraine. With I. Marton, he was the founder of the Transcarpathian school of composition. Honored Art Worker of Ukrainian SSR (1972).

Life 
Zador studied piano with Lengyel Zsigmond. He graduated from the Prague Conservatory (1932–1934) with honors in organ, conducting and piano. He attended lectures on composition by Vítězslav Novák, Jaroslav Křička, and lectures by Zdeněk Nejedlý at Charles University.

From 1934 to 1936, he performed as a pianist, from 1936 to 1938 he completed a postgraduate course in composition and musicology in Prague, at the same time a music adviser from Subcarpathian Russia at the Ministry of Education, and from 1938 he worked as a teacher in Subcarpathian Russia (Czechoslovakia).

As a conductor he began to study Transcarpathian folklore music, and organized folklore expeditions, during which he recorded more than 300 folk songs, kolomyyok, carols, ritual songs. As a result, the part was published in the collection "Folk Songs of the Subcarpathian Ruthenians" (Ungvar, 1944).

He also wrote a theoretical work "Kolomyika in Russian folk art".

From 1947 to 1950, he was the conductor and soloist of the Uzhhorod Symphony Orchestra. From 1948 to 1949 he was dismissed as cosmopolitanism. From 1954 to 1963, he was the artistic director of the Uzhhorod Philharmonic, and from 1963 to 1985, he was a professor at the Lviv Conservatory.

In 1992, Uzhhorod State Music School was named after him.

References 

1912 births
1985 deaths
20th-century organists
20th-century pianists
Musicians from Uzhhorod
Prague Conservatory alumni
Recipients of the Order of the Red Banner of Labour
Male organists
Czechoslovak conductors (music)
Czechoslovak musicians
Czechoslovak pianists
Soviet conductors (music)
Soviet male composers
Soviet music educators
Soviet pianists